YMC may be an abbreviation for:

 Yale Model Congress, USA
 Young Magicians Club, United Kingdom 
 YMC (motorcycles and buggies), vehicle manufacturer from Greece
 Ye Maaya Chesave, a 2010 Telugu film.